Jack Henry & Associates, Inc.  is an American technology company and payment processing service for the financial services industry. It serves more than 9,000 customers nationwide, and operates through three primary brands. Headquartered in Monett, Missouri, JHA made $1.55 billion in annual revenue during fiscal 2019.

History 
Jack Henry & Associates (commonly referred to as JHA) was formed in 1976 by Jack Henry and Jerry Hall in Monett, Missouri. In 1977, Jack Henry & Associates was incorporated and generated $115,222 in revenue.

On November 20, 1985, an initial public offering made JHA a public company trading 3,125,000 common shares on the NASDAQ exchange under the symbol JKHY. In 1992, the company began to aggressively acquire companies that expanded its product offering and its client base. It acquired Symitar in 2000, establishing its second brand which serves the credit union industry. In 2004, JHA acquired a number of companies and products that can be sold outside JHA's core client base to all financial services organizations regardless of charter, asset size, core processing platform. In 2006, JHA launched its third primary brand – ProfitStars – to encompass the specialized products and services assembled through its acquisitions. In 2012, JHA announced $1 billion in annual revenue.

Corporate structure 
Jack Henry & Associates, Inc. operates through three primary brands listed below.

Jack Henry Banking
Jack Henry Banking is a provider of integrated computer systems for banks ranging from de novo to institutions. Jack Henry Banking currently serves approximately 1,000 banks.

Symitar
Symitar was founded in 1984 and acquired by JHA in 2000. It is a provider of integrated computer systems for credit unions of all sizes. Symitar's product is Episys, a software application used to manage member base and process transactions.

ProfitStars
ProfitStars is a core-agnostic solution provider to banks and credit unions. It is headquartered in Allen, TX.

Acquisitions

2022 
 Payrailz

2019 
 Geezeo

2018 
 BOLTS Technologies, Inc.
 Agiletics, Inc.

2017 
 Ensenta Corporation
 Vanguard Software Group

2015 
 Bayside Business Solutions

2014 
 Banno

2010 
 iPay Technologies

2009 
 Pemco Technologies
 Goldleaf Financial Solutions, Inc.

2007 
 AudioTel Corporation
 Gladiator Technology Services

2006 
 US Banking Alliance

2005 
 Profitstar Inc.
 Select Payment Processing, Inc.
 Verinex Technologies, Inc.
 Optinfo, Inc.
 TWS, Inc.
 Synergy
 Stratika
 Tangent Analytics, LLC

References

External links

American companies established in 1976
Financial services companies of the United States
Software companies of the United States
Software companies based in Missouri
Financial services companies established in 1976
Software companies established in 1976
1976 establishments in Missouri
Companies listed on the Nasdaq
Banking software companies
1980s initial public offerings
Barry County, Missouri